DeOssie is a surname. Notable people with the surname include:

Steve DeOssie (born 1962), American football player
Zak DeOssie (born 1984), American football player, son of Steve